Jason Rowbotham (born 3 January 1969) is a Welsh former professional footballer, who played as a left back.

Career
Rowbotham began his professional career in 1987 with Plymouth Argyle, spending five years at Home Park. In 1992, a move to Shrewsbury Town yielded no appearances and Rowbotham quickly moved on, to Hereford. After just five appearances, Rowbotham headed north to Kirkcaldy with Raith Rovers in July 1993 and started the most successful period of his career. In his three years with Rovers, Rowbotham suffered relegation from the Premier Division but won the resulting First Division, with a League Cup win in between. Rowbotham was also part of Raith's only season in Europe. Shortly after Rovers' First Division win, Rowbotham moved back to England with Wycombe in a £40,000 deal. In his two years at Adams Park, Rowbotham featured in over thirty matches and after a loan spell with first club Plymouth, returned to the club for a second permanent spell in 1997. Following his release in 2000, Rowbotham played a handful of matches for Torquay United on a non-contract basis before leaving in January 2001 and finishing his career in non-league football with Weymouth and Merthyr Tydfil.

Honours
Raith Rovers
 Scottish League Cup: 1994–95
 Scottish First Division: 1994–95

References

External links

Profile at Sportsbox

Welsh footballers
Association football fullbacks
Sheffield United F.C. players
Scunthorpe United F.C. players
Barnsley F.C. players
Plymouth Argyle F.C. players
St Mirren F.C. players
Partick Thistle F.C. players
Raith Rovers F.C. players
East Fife F.C. players
Ross County F.C. players
Wycombe Wanderers F.C. players
Scottish Football League players
English Football League players
1969 births
Living people
Wales youth international footballers
Footballers from Cardiff